Bhanwar Lal Sharma (17 April 1945 – 9 October 2022) was an Indian politician. He was a 7th term Member of Legislative Assembly (MLA) from Sardarshahar, Churu, Rajasthan. He emerged as a national figure in the Brahmin Samaj as he was President of All India Brahmin Federation since 2011. He was a Cabinet Minister of Indira Gandhi Neher Pariyojana in Rajasthan Government.

Early life
Bhanwar Lal Sharma, was born on 17 April 1945 at Sardarshahar, and he was the eldest son of Sewak Ram Sharma. He grew up in poverty and left school in the 10th grade.  He was later adopted by Maanak Ram Sharma, a family member who at that time, was a sales officer (also known as Jagaati Thanedar). Maanak Ram Sharma gave a major contribution to Pt. Bhanwar Lal Sharma's first Panchayat election campaign. He is a strict vegetarian.

Sharma was married to Mrs. Manohari Devi who belongs to the tehsil of Nohar. He had two sons, Anil Kumar Sharma and Keshari Chand Sharma and two daughters, Tara Sharma and Indra Sharma.

Social
Sharma was also the President of Rajasthan Brahmin Maha Sabha between 1994 and 2000 and from 2002. Rajasthan Brahmin MahaSabha is a social organisation of 75 lakhs of Rajasthani Brahmins. After becoming the president of Rajasthan Brahmin Mahasabha, he purchased a piece of land from the Rajasthan government and built a Boys Hostel for the students coming from various districts of Rajasthan for their higher education and a guesthouse for the members of Brahmin Samaj.

Sharma was against caste-based reservation, preferring reservation on economic bases. Rallies in Sikar (24 November 2002) and Bikaner (12 January),  Alwar (2 February), Kota, Bhilwara, Udaipur and Jodhpur (27 April), ending with a show of strength in Jaipur on 7 September.

Sharma said: "The great sage Chanakya advised the powerful ruler Chandragupta Maurya, but lived in a jhonpri (hut) outside the rajmahal (palace). Well, we're not satisfied with the jhonpri. We want the palace".

Sharma was instrumental in having several temples built, including Shree shyam temple, Ramdev temple and Thakur ji temple, Shivalay.

Political
Sharma was Sarpanch in the Gram Panchayat of Jaitsisar from 1962 to 1982, Pradhan Panchayat Samiti of Sardarshahar from 1982 to 1985, Member of the Rajasthan Legislative Assembly from 1985 until 2022, Deputy Chief Whip from March 1990 to October 1990, former Cabinet Minister I.G.N.P. Indira Gandhi Canal Pariyojna from 1990 to 1992. His wife, Manohari Devi, has political background. She has been a member of Panchayat Samiti, Sardarshahar, Sarpanch Gram Panchayat Jaitsisar and Pradhan of Panchayat Samiti, Sardarshahar. His politics was based on simple political philosophy "Say Clear".

Achievements
Sharma implemented the Aapni Yojna.

Sharma signed an MOU with German government as Indira Gandhi Canal minister for Aapni Yojna project in Churu, Jhunjhunu and Hanumangarh for safe and pure drinking water. Aapni Yojna's first phase covered 370 villages in Churu, Hanumangarh and Jhunjhunu districts of northern Rajasthan and two towns (Taranagar and Sardarshahar) from Churu. Water is available 24 hours a day in the villages. There are simple payment methods. Villages have one meter and villagers pay their dues. Health benefits include more awareness of health and hygiene. Economic prosperity has come with women having started income generation activities in the villages. There has also been improved community participation with maintenance of the safe drinking water facility by villagers.

Today, Aapni Yojna is the backbone for the availability of drinking water for Churu, Jhunjhunu & Hanumangarh district.

References

1945 births
2022 deaths
Indian National Congress politicians
Janata Dal politicians
Lok Dal politicians
Rajasthan MLAs 1977–1980
Rajasthani politicians
State cabinet ministers of Rajasthan
People from Churu district